An equation of state introduced by R. H. Cole

References

External links
 Cole equation of state article at sklogwiki

Equations of state